Fairmont is an unincorporated community in Clark County, in the U.S. state of Missouri.

History
Fairmont was laid out in 1851, and named for its lofty elevation. A post office called Fairmont was established in 1851, and remained in operation until 1907.

References

Unincorporated communities in Clark County, Missouri
Unincorporated communities in Missouri